

Events

Pre-1600
331 BC – Alexander the Great defeats Darius III of Persia in the Battle of Gaugamela.
 366 – Pope Damasus I is consecrated.
 959 – Edgar the Peaceful becomes king of all England, in succession to Eadwig.
 965 – Pope John XIII is consecrated.
1553 – The coronation of Queen Mary I of England is held at Westminster Abbey.
1588 – The coronation of Shah Abbas I of Persia occurs.

1601–1900
1730 – Ahmed III is forced to abdicate as the Ottoman sultan.
1779 – The city of Tampere, Finland (belonging to Sweden at this time) is founded by King Gustav III of Sweden.
1787 – Russians under Alexander Suvorov defeat the Turks at Kinburn.
1791 – First session of the French Legislative Assembly.
1795 – More than a year after the Battle of Sprimont, the Austrian Netherlands (present-day Belgium) are officially annexed by Revolutionary France.
1800 – Via the Third Treaty of San Ildefonso, Spain cedes Louisiana to France, which would sell the land to the United States thirty months later.
1814 – The Congress of Vienna opens with the intention of redrawing Europe's political map after the defeat of Napoleon in the previous spring.
1827 – Russo-Persian War: The Russian army under Ivan Paskevich storms Yerevan, ending a millennium of Muslim domination of Armenia.
1829 – The South African College is founded in Cape Town, later separating into the University of Cape Town and the South African College Schools.
1832 – Texian political delegates convene at San Felipe de Austin to petition for changes in the governance of Mexican Texas.
1861 – Mrs Beeton's Book of Household Management is published, going on to sell 60,000 copies in its first year and remaining in print until the present day.
1887 – Balochistan is conquered by the British Empire.
1890 – Yosemite National Park is established by the U.S. Congress.
1891 – Stanford University opens its doors in California, United States.
1898 – The Vienna University of Economics and Business Administration is founded under the name k.u.k. Exportakademie.

1901–present
1903 – Baseball: The Boston Americans play the Pittsburgh Pirates in the first game of the modern World Series.
1908 – Ford Model T automobiles are offered for sale at a price of US$825.
1910 – A large bomb destroys the Los Angeles Times building, killing 21.
1918 – World War I: The Egyptian Expeditionary Force captures Damascus.
  1918   – Sayid Abdullah becomes the last Khan of Khiva.
1928 – The Soviet Union introduces its first five-year plan.
  1928   – Newark Liberty International Airport opens, becoming the first airport in the New York City metro area.
1931 – The George Washington Bridge in the United States is opened, linking New Jersey and New York.
  1931   – Clara Campoamor persuades the Constituent Cortes to enfranchise women in Spain's new constitution.
1936 – Spanish Civil War: Francisco Franco is named head of the Nationalist government of Spain.
  1936   – Spanish Civil War: The Central Committee of Antifascist Militias of Catalonia dissolves itself, handing control of Catalan defence militias over to the Generalitat.
1938 – Pursuant to the Munich Agreement signed the day before, Nazi Germany begins the military occupation and annexation of Czechoslovakia Sudetenland.
1939 – World War II: After a one-month siege, German troops occupy Warsaw.
1940 – The Pennsylvania Turnpike, often considered the first superhighway in the United States, opens to traffic.
1942 – World War II:  torpedoes Lisbon Maru, not knowing that she is carrying British prisoners of war from Hong Kong.
1943 – World War II: After the Four Days of Naples, Allied troops enter the city.
1946 – Nazi leaders are sentenced at the Nuremberg trials.
  1946   – The Daegu October incident occurs in Allied-occupied Korea.
1947 – The North American F-86 Sabre flies for the first time.
1949 – The People's Republic of China is established.
1953 – Andhra State is formed, consisting of a Telugu-speaking area carved out of India's Madras State.
  1953   – A United States-South Korea mutual defense treaty is concluded in Washington, D.C.
1955 – The Xinjiang Uyghur Autonomous Region is established.
1957 – The motto In God We Trust first appears on U.S. paper currency.
1958 – The National Advisory Committee for Aeronautics is replaced by NASA.
1960 – Nigeria gains independence from the United Kingdom.
1961 – The United States Defense Intelligence Agency is formed, becoming the country's first centralized military intelligence organization.
  1961   – East and West Cameroon merge to form the Federal Republic of Cameroon.
  1961   – The CTV Television Network, Canada's first private television network, is launched.
1962 – James Meredith enters the University of Mississippi, defying racial segregation rules.
1964 – The Free Speech Movement is launched on the campus of the University of California, Berkeley.
  1964   – Japanese Shinkansen ("bullet trains") begin high-speed rail service from Tokyo to Osaka.
1966 – West Coast Airlines Flight 956 crashes with no survivors in Oregon.  This accident marks the first loss of a DC-9.
1968 – Guyana nationalizes the British Guiana Broadcasting Service, which would eventually become part of the National Communications Network, Guyana.
1969 – Concorde breaks the sound barrier for the first time.
1971 – Walt Disney World opens near Orlando, Florida.
  1971   – The first practical CT scanner is used to diagnose a patient.
1975 – Muhammad Ali defeats Joe Frazier in a boxing match in Manila, Philippines.
1978 – Tuvalu gains independence from the United Kingdom.
1979 – Pope John Paul II begins his first pastoral visit to the United States.
  1979   – The MTR, Hong Kong's rapid transit railway system, opens.
1982 – Helmut Kohl replaces Helmut Schmidt as Chancellor of Germany through a constructive vote of no confidence.
  1982   – EPCOT (Experimental Prototype Community of Tomorrow) opens at Walt Disney World in Florida.
  1982   – Sony and Phillips launch the compact disc in Japan; on the same day, Sony releases the model CDP-101 compact disc player, the first player of its kind.
1985 – Israel-Palestinian conflict: Israel attacks the Palestine Liberation Organization's Tunisia headquarters during Operation Wooden Leg.
1987 – The 5.9  Whittier Narrows earthquake shakes the San Gabriel Valley with a Mercalli intensity of VIII (Severe), killing eight and injuring 200.
1989 – Denmark introduces the world's first legal same-sex registered partnerships.
1991 – Croatian War of Independence: The Siege of Dubrovnik begins.
1994 – Palau enters a Compact of Free Association with the United States.
2000 – Israel-Palestinian conflict: Palestinians protest the murder of 12-year-old Muhammad al-Durrah by Israeli police  in northern Israel, beginning the "October 2000 events".
2001 – Militants attack the state legislature building in Kashmir, killing 38.
2009 – The Supreme Court of the United Kingdom takes over the judicial functions of the House of Lords.
2012 – A ferry collision off the coast of Hong Kong kills 38 people and injures 102 others.
2014 – A series of explosions at a gunpowder plant in Bulgaria completely destroys the factory, killing 15 people.
  2014   – A double bombing of an elementary school in Homs, Syria kills over 50 people.
2015 – A gunman kills nine people at a community college in Oregon.
  2015   – Heavy rains trigger a major landslide in Guatemala, killing 280 people.
  2015   – The American cargo vessel SS El Faro sinks with all of its 33 crew after steaming into the eyewall of Hurricane Joaquin.
2017 – An independence referendum, later declared illegal by the Constitutional Court of Spain, takes place in Catalonia.
  2017   – Fifty-eight people are killed and 869 others injured in a mass shooting at a country music festival at the Las Vegas Strip in the United States; the gunman, Stephen Paddock, later commits suicide.
2018 – The International Court of Justice rules that Chile is not obliged to negotiate access to the Pacific Ocean with Bolivia.
2019 – Kuopio school stabbing: one dies and ten are injured when Joel Marin, armed with a sabre, attacks a school class at Savo Vocational College in Kuopio, Finland.

Births

Pre-1600
86 BC – Sallust, Roman historian (d. 34 BC)
 208 – Alexander Severus, Roman emperor (d. 235)
1207 – Henry III of England (d. 1272)
1476 – Guy XVI, Count of Laval (d. 1531)
1480 – Saint Cajetan, Italian Catholic priest and religious reformer (d. 1547)
1507 – Giacomo Barozzi da Vignola, Italian architect who designed the Church of the Gesù (d. 1573)
1526 – Dorothy Stafford, English noble (d. 1604)
1540 – Johann Jakob Grynaeus, Swiss pastor and theologian (d. 1617)
1542 – Álvaro de Mendaña de Neira, Spanish explorer (d. 1595)
1550 – Anne of Saint Bartholomew, Spanish Discalced Carmelite nun (d. 1626)
1554 – Leonardus Lessius, Jesuit theologian (d. 1623)

1601–1900
1620 – Nicolaes Pieterszoon Berchem, Dutch painter (d. 1683)
1671 – Luigi Guido Grandi, Italian monk, mathematician, and engineer (d. 1742)
1681 – Giulia Lama, Italian painter (d. 1747)
1685 – Charles VI, Holy Roman Emperor (d. 1740)
1691 – Arthur Onslow, English lawyer and politician, Speaker of the House of Commons (d. 1768)
1712 – William Shippen, American physician and politician (d. 1801)
1719 – John Bligh, 3rd Earl of Darnley, British parliamentarian (d. 1781)
1724 – Giovanni Battista Cirri, Italian cellist and composer (d. 1808)
1729 – Anton Cajetan Adlgasser, German organist and composer (d. 1777)
1730 – Richard Stockton, American lawyer, jurist, and politician (d. 1781)
1760 – William Thomas Beckford, English author and politician (d. 1844)
1762 – Anton Bernolák, Slovak priest and linguist (d. 1813)
1771 – Pierre Baillot, French violinist and composer (d. 1842)
1791 – Sergey Aksakov, Russian soldier and author (d. 1859)
1808 – Mary Anna Custis Lee, American wife of Robert E. Lee (d. 1873)
1832 – Caroline Harrison, American educator, 24th First Lady of the United States (d. 1892)
  1832   – Henry Clay Work, American composer and songwriter (d. 1884)
1835 – Ádám Politzer, Hungarian-Austrian physician and anatomist (d. 1920)
1842 – S. Subramania Iyer, Indian lawyer and jurist (d. 1924)
  1842   – Charles Cros, French poet and author (d. 1888)
  1846   – Nectarios of Aegina, Greek metropolitan and saint (d. 1920)
1847 – Annie Besant, English-Indian activist and author (d. 1933)
1865 – Paul Dukas, French composer, scholar, and critic (d. 1935)
1878 – Othmar Spann, Austrian economist, sociologist, and philosopher (d. 1950)
1881 – William Boeing, American engineer and businessman who founded the Boeing Company (d. 1956)
1885 – Louis Untermeyer,  American poet, anthologist, and critic (d. 1977)
1887 – Ned Hanlon, Australian politician, 26th Premier of Queensland (d. 1952)
  1887   – Shizuichi Tanaka, Japanese general (d. 1945)
1890 – Stanley Holloway, English actor (d. 1982)
1893 – Cliff Friend, American pianist and songwriter (d. 1974)
  1893   – Ip Man, Chinese martial artist (d. 1972)
1894 – Edgar Krahn, Estonian mathematician and academic (d. 1961)
1895 – Liaquat Ali Khan, Indian-Pakistani lawyer and politician, 1st Prime Minister of Pakistan (d. 1951)
1896 – Ted Healy, American actor, singer, and screenwriter (d. 1937)
1899 – Ernest Haycox, American author (d. 1950)
1900 – Tom Goddard, English cricketer (d. 1966)

1901–present
1903 – Vladimir Horowitz, Russian-born American pianist and composer (d. 1989)
  1903   – Pierre Veyron, French race car driver (d. 1970)
1904 – Otto Robert Frisch, Austrian-English physicist and academic (d. 1979)
  1904   – A. K. Gopalan, Indian educator and politician (d. 1977)
1906 – S. D. Burman, Indian composer and singer (d. 1975)
1907 – Maurice Bardèche, French journalist, author, and critic (d. 1998)
  1907   – Ödön Pártos, Hungarian-Israeli viola player and composer (d. 1977)
1908 – Herman David Koppel, Danish pianist and composer (d. 1998)
1909 – Sam Yorty, American captain, politician, and 37th Mayor of Los Angeles (d. 1998)
1910 – Bonnie Parker, American criminal (d. 1934)
  1910   – Fritz Köberle, Austrian-Brazilian physician and pathologist (d. 1983)
  1910   – José Enrique Moyal, Australian physicist and engineer (d. 1998)
  1910   – Chaim Pinchas Scheinberg, Polish-Israeli rabbi and scholar (d. 2012)
1911 – Irwin Kostal, American songwriter, screenwriter, and publisher (d. 1994)
  1911   – Heinrich Mark, Estonian lawyer and politician, 5th Prime Minister of Estonia in exile (d. 2004)
1912 – Kathleen Ollerenshaw, English mathematician, astronomer, and politician, Lord Mayor of Manchester (d. 2014)
1913 – Hélio Gracie, Brazilian martial artist (d. 2009)
  1913   – Harry Lookofsky, American violinist and producer (d. 1998)
1914 – Daniel J. Boorstin, American historian, lawyer, author, and 12th Librarian of Congress (d. 2004)
1915 – Jerome Bruner, American psychologist and author (d. 2016)
1917 – Cahal Daly, Irish cardinal and theologian (d. 2009)
1919 – Bob Boyd, American baseball player (d. 2004)
  1919   – Majrooh Sultanpuri, Indian poet and songwriter (d. 2000)
1920 – David Herbert Donald, American historian and author (d. 2009)
  1920   – Walter Matthau, American actor (d. 2000)
1921 – James Whitmore, American actor (d. 2009)
1922 – Chen-Ning Yang, Chinese-American physicist, academic, and Nobel Prize laureate
1924 – Jimmy Carter, American naval lieutenant, politician, 39th President of the United States, and Nobel Prize laureate
  1924   – Bob Geigel, American wrestler and promoter (d. 2014)
  1924   – Leonie Kramer, Australian academic (d. 2016)
  1924   – William Rehnquist, American lawyer and jurist, 16th Chief Justice of the United States (d. 2005)
  1924   – Roger Williams, American pianist (d. 2011)
1927 – Tom Bosley, American actor (d. 2010)
  1927   – Sherman Glenn Finesilver, American lawyer and judge (d. 2006)
  1927   – Sandy Gall, Malaysian-Scottish journalist and author
1928 – Laurence Harvey, Lithuanian-English actor, director, and producer (d. 1973)
  1928   – Willy Mairesse, Belgian race car driver (d. 1969)
  1928   – George Peppard, American actor (d. 1994)
  1928   – Zhu Rongji, Chinese engineer and politician, 5th Premier of the People's Republic of China
1929 – Ken Arthurson, Australian rugby player and coach
  1929   – Grady Chapman, American singer (d. 2011)
  1929   – Bonnie Owens, American singer-songwriter (d. 2006)
1930 – Frank Gardner, Australian race car driver and manager (d. 2009)
  1930   – Richard Harris, Irish actor (d. 2002)
  1930   – Naimatullah Khan, Pakistani lawyer and politician, Mayor of Karachi (d. 2020)
  1930   – Philippe Noiret, French actor (d. 2006)
1931 – Sylvano Bussotti, Italian violinist and composer
  1931   – Anwar Shamim, Pakistani general (d. 2013)
  1931   – Alan Wagner, American radio host and critic (d. 2007)
1932 – Albert Collins, American singer-songwriter and guitarist (d. 1993)
1934 – Emilio Botín, Spanish banker and businessman (d. 2014)
1935 – Julie Andrews, English actress and singer
  1935   – Walter De Maria, American sculptor and drummer (d. 2013)
1936 – Duncan Edwards, English footballer (d. 1958)
1937 – Saeed Ahmed, Pakistani cricketer
1938 – Tunç Başaran, Turkish actor, director, producer, and screenwriter (d. 2019)
  1938   – Mary McFadden, American fashion designer
  1938   – Stella Stevens, American actress and director (d. 2023)
1939 – George Archer, American golfer (d. 2005)
  1939   – Geoffrey Whitehead, English actor
1940 – Steve O'Rourke, English race car driver and manager (d. 2003)
  1940   – Marc Savoy, American accordion player, created the Cajun accordion
  1940   – Phyllis Chesler, American feminist psychologist, who wrote Women and Madness (1972)
1942 – Herb Fame, American R&B singer
  1942   – Jean-Pierre Jabouille, French race car driver and engineer (d. 2023)
  1942   – Robert Lelièvre, French singer-songwriter and guitarist (d. 1973)
  1942   – David Stancliffe, English bishop and scholar
  1942   – Günter Wallraff, German journalist and author
1943 – Jean-Jacques Annaud, French director, producer, and screenwriter
  1943   – Angèle Arsenault, Canadian singer-songwriter (d. 2014)
  1943   – Jerry Martini, American saxophonist 
  1943   – Robert Slater, American author and journalist (d. 2014)
1945 – Rod Carew, Panamanian-American baseball player and coach
  1945   – Ram Nath Kovind, 14th President of India
  1945   – Donny Hathaway, American singer-songwriter, pianist, and producer (d. 1979)
1946 – Dave Holland, English bassist, composer, and bandleader 
  1946   – Tim O'Brien, American novelist and short story writer
1947 – Dave Arneson, American game designer, co-created Dungeons & Dragons (d. 2009)
  1947   – Dalveer Bhandari, Indian lawyer and judge
  1947   – Buzz Capra, American baseball player and coach
  1947   – Aaron Ciechanover, Israeli biologist and physician, Nobel Prize laureate
  1947   – Stephen Collins, American actor and director
  1947   – Nevill Drury, English-Australian journalist and publisher (d. 2013)
  1947   – Adriano Tilgher, Italian politician
  1947   – Martin Turner, English singer-songwriter and bass player 
  1947   – Mariska Veres, Dutch singer (d. 2006)
1948 – Cub Koda, American singer-songwriter and guitarist (d. 2000)
1949 – Isaac Bonewits, American singer-songwriter, liturgist, and author (d. 2010)
  1949   – Sheila Gilmore, Scottish lawyer and politician
  1949   – André Rieu, Dutch violinist, composer, and conductor
1950 – Elpida, Greek singer-songwriter
  1950   – Susan Greenfield, Baroness Greenfield, English neuroscientist, academic, and politician
  1950   – Mark Helias, American bassist and composer
  1950   – Sigbjørn Johnsen, Norwegian politician, Norwegian Minister of Finance
  1950   – Boris Morukov, Russian physician and astronaut (d. 2015)
  1950   – Randy Quaid, American actor 
1951 – Brian Greenway, Canadian singer-songwriter and guitarist 
1952 – Jacques Martin, Canadian ice hockey player, coach, and manager
  1952   – Bob Myrick, American baseball player (d. 2012)
  1952   – Ivan Sekyra, Czech singer-songwriter and guitarist  (d. 2012)
  1952   – Earl Slick, American rock guitarist and songwriter
1953 – Pete Falcone, American baseball player
  1953   – Viljar Loor, Estonian volleyball player (d. 2011)
  1953   – Miguel Lopez, Salvadorian-American soccer player
  1953   – Grete Waitz, Norwegian runner and coach (d. 2011)
  1953   – Klaus Wowereit, German civil servant and politician, Governing Mayor of Berlin
1955 – Howard Hewett, American R&B singer-songwriter
  1955   – Morten Gunnar Larsen, Norwegian pianist and composer
  1955   – Jeff Reardon, American baseball player
1956 – Andrus Ansip, Estonian engineer and politician, 15th Prime Minister of Estonia
  1956   – Theresa May, English politician, former Prime Minister of the United Kingdom
1957 – Kang Seok-woo, South Korean actor
  1957   – Éva Tardos, Hungarian mathematician and educator
1958 – Martin Cooper, English saxophonist, composer, and painter 
  1958   – Masato Nakamura, Japanese bass player and producer 
1959 – Mark Aizlewood, Welsh footballer and manager
  1959   – Brian P. Cleary, American author and poet
  1959   – Youssou N'Dour, Senegalese singer-songwriter, musician, and politician 
1960 – Joshua Wurman, American scientist, Doppler on Wheels inventor, and storm chaser
1961 – Gary Ablett, Sr., Australian footballer
  1961   – Rico Constantino, American wrestler and manager
  1961   – Corrie van Zyl, South African cricketer and coach
1962 – Attaphol Buspakom, Thai footballer and manager (d. 2015)
  1962   – Nico Claesen, Belgian footballer and coach
  1962   – Esai Morales, American actor
  1962   – Paul Walsh, English footballer and sportscaster
1963 – Jean-Denis Délétraz, Swiss race car driver
  1963   – Mark McGwire, American baseball player and coach
1964 – Max Matsuura, Japanese songwriter, producer, and manager
  1964   – Jonathan Sarfati, Australian-New Zealand chess player and author
  1964   – Christopher Titus, American actor, producer, and screenwriter
  1964   – Harry Hill, English comedian and author
1965 – Andreas Keller, German field hockey player
  1965   – Chris Reason, Australian journalist
  1965   – Cliff Ronning, Canadian ice hockey player and coach
  1965   – Mia Mottley, Barbadian prime minister
1966 – George Weah, Liberian footballer and politician, 25th President of Liberia
  1966   – José Ángel Ziganda, Spanish footballer and manager
1967 – Mike Pringle, American-Canadian football player
  1967   – Scott Young, American ice hockey player and coach
1968 – Sacha Dean Biyan, Canadian photographer and journalist
  1968   – Rob Collard, English race car driver
  1968   – Mark Durden-Smith, British television presenter
  1968   – Phil de Glanville, English rugby player
  1968   – Kevin Griffin, American singer-songwriter, guitarist, and producer 
  1968   – Jon Guenther, American author and engineer
  1968   – Jay Underwood, American actor and pastor
1969 – Zach Galifianakis, American actor, comedian, producer, and screenwriter
  1969   – Joseph Patrick Moore, American musician, composer, and producer
  1969   – Ori Kaplan, Israeli-American saxophonist and producer 
  1969   – Marcus Stephen, Nauruan weightlifter and politician, 27th President of Nauru
  1969   – Igor Ulanov, Russian ice hockey player
1970 – Simon Davey, Welsh footballer and manager
  1970   – Alexei Zhamnov, Russian ice hockey player and manager
1971 – Yvette Hermundstad, Swedish journalist
  1971   – Andrew O'Keefe, Australian lawyer and television host
  1971   – Jim Serdaris, Australian rugby league player
1972 – Ronen Altman Kaydar, Israeli author and poet
  1972   – Jean Paulo Fernandes, Brazilian footballer
  1972   – Esa Holopainen, Finnish singer-songwriter and guitarist 
  1972   – Nicky Morgan, British politician
1973 – Christian Borle, American actor and singer
  1973   – Rachid Chékhémani, French runner
  1973   – Jana Henke, German swimmer
  1973   – John Mackey, American composer
  1973   – John Thomson, American baseball player and coach
1974 – Keith Duffy, Irish singer-songwriter, dancer, and actor 
  1974   – Nick Graham, Australian rugby player
  1974   – Mats Lindgren, Swedish ice hockey player and coach
1975 – Justin Leppitsch, Australian rules footballer
  1975   – Zoltán Sebescen, German footballer and coach
1976 – Denis Gauthier, Canadian ice hockey player
  1976   – Ümit Karan, Turkish footballer
  1976   – Richard Oakes, English guitarist and songwriter 
  1976   – Antonio Roybal, American painter and sculptor
  1976   – Mark Švets, Estonian footballer
1977 – Christel Takigawa, French-Japanese journalist
  1977   – Jeffrey van Hooydonk, Belgian race car driver
1978 – Nicole Atkins, American singer-songwriter
  1978   – Leticia Cline, American model and journalist
  1978   – Joe Keith, English footballer
  1978   – Dominic Thornely, Australian cricketer
1979 – Curtis Axel, American wrestler
  1979   – Rudi Johnson, American football player
  1979   – Gilberto Martínez, Costa Rican footballer
  1979   – Ryan Pontbriand, American football player
  1979   – Marko Stanojevic, English-Italian rugby player
1980 – Sarah Drew, American actress
  1980   – Antonio Narciso, Italian footballer
1981 – Júlio Baptista, Brazilian footballer
  1981   – Tom Donnelly, New Zealand rugby player
  1981   – Gaby Mudingayi, Belgian footballer
  1981   – Johnny Oduya, Swedish ice hockey player
  1981   – Arnau Riera, Spanish footballer
  1981   – David Yelldell, German-American soccer player
1982 – Haruna Babangida, Nigerian footballer
  1982   – Aleksandar Đuričić, Serbian author and playwright
1983 – Mohamed Abdelwahab, Egyptian footballer (d. 2006)
  1983   – Mirko Vučinić, Montenegrin footballer
1984 – Matt Cain, American baseball player
  1984   – Daniel Guillén Ruiz, Spanish footballer
1985 – Nazimuddin Ahmed, Bangladeshi cricketer
1986 – Sayaka Kanda, Japanese actress and singer (d. 2021)
  1986   – Ricardo Vaz Tê, Portuguese footballer
1987 – Hiroki Aiba, Japanese actor and singer
  1987   – Mitchell Aubusson, Australian rugby league player
1989 – Brie Larson, American actress 
1990 – Pedro Filipe Mendes, Portuguese footballer
  1990   – Albert Prosa, Estonian footballer
1991 – Conor Clifford, Irish footballer
1992 – Xander Bogaerts, Aruban baseball player
1995 – Lauren Hill, American basketball player (d. 2015)
2001 – Mason Greenwood, English footballer

Deaths

Pre-1600
 630 – Tajoom Uk'ab K'ahk', Mayan king 
 686 – Emperor Tenmu of Japan (b. 631)
 804 – Richbod, archbishop of Trier
 895 – Kong Wei, chancellor of the Tang Dynasty
 918 – Zhou, empress of Former Shu
 959 – Eadwig, English king (b. 941)
 961 – Artald, archbishop of Reims
1040 – Alan III, Duke of Brittany (b. 997)
1126 – Morphia of Melitene, Queen of Jerusalem
1310 – Beatrice of Burgundy, Lady of Bourbon (b. 1257)
1404 – Pope Boniface IX (b. 1356)
1416 – Yaqub Spata, Albanian ruler 
1450 – Leonello d'Este, Marquis of Ferrara, Italian noble (b. 1407)
1499 – Marsilio Ficino, Italian astrologer and philosopher (b. 1433)
1500 – John Alcock, English bishop and politician, Lord Chancellor of the United Kingdom (b. 1430)
1532 – Jan Mabuse, Flemish painter
1567 – Pietro Carnesecchi, Italian humanist (b. 1508)
1570 – Frans Floris, Flemish painter (b. 1520)
1574 – Maarten van Heemskerck, Dutch painter (b. 1498)
1578 – John of Austria (b. 1547)
1588 – Edward James, English priest and martyr (b. 1557)

1601–1900
1602 – Hernando de Cabezón, Spanish organist and composer (b. 1541)
1609 – Giammateo Asola, Italian priest and composer (b. 1532)
1652 – Jan Asselijn, Dutch painter (b. 1610)
1683 – John Hull, colonial American merchant and politician (b. 1624)
1684 – Pierre Corneille, French playwright (b. 1606)
1693 – Pedro Abarca, Spanish theologian and academic (b. 1619)
1708 – John Blow, English organist and composer (b. 1649)
1768 – Robert Simson, Scottish mathematician and academic (b. 1687)
1788 – William Brodie, Scottish businessman and politician (b. 1741)
1837 – Robert Clark, American politician (b. 1777)
1838 – Charles Tennant, Scottish chemist and businessman (b. 1768)
1864 – Rose O'Neal Greenhow, American spy (b. 1817)
1878 – Mindon Min, Burmese king (b. 1808)
1885 – John Light Atlee, American physician and surgeon (b. 1799)
1895 – Eli Whitney Blake, Jr., American chemist, physicist, and academic (b. 1836)

1901–present
1901 – Abdur Rahman Khan, Afghan emir (b. 1844)
1913 – Eugene O'Keefe, Canadian businessman and philanthropist (b. 1827)
1929 – Antoine Bourdelle, French sculptor and painter (b. 1861)
1940 – Chiungtze C. Tsen, Chinese mathematician (b. 1898)
1942 – Ants Piip, Estonian lawyer and politician, 7th Prime Minister of Estonia (b. 1884)
1950 – Faik Ali Ozansoy, Turkish poet, educator, and politician (b. 1876)
1951 – Peter McWilliam, Scottish-English footballer and manager (b. 1878)
1953 – John Marin, American painter (b. 1870)
1955 – Charles Christie, American film producer who founded Christie Film Company (b. 1880)
1957 – Abdülhalik Renda, Turkish civil servant, politician, and sixth Turkish Minister of National Defence (b. 1881)
1958 – Robert Falk, Russian painter and educator (b. 1886)
1959 – Enrico De Nicola, Italian journalist, lawyer, politician, and first President of Italy (b. 1877)
1961 – Ludwig Bemelmans, Italian-American author and illustrator (b. 1898)
1968 – Romano Guardini, Italian-German Catholic priest, author, and academic (b. 1885) 
1970 – Raúl Riganti, Argentinian race car driver (b. 1893)
1972 – Louis Leakey, Kenyan-English archaeologist and paleontologist (b. 1903)
1974 – Spyridon Marinatos, Greek archaeologist and academic (b. 1901)
1975 – Al Jackson, Jr., American drummer, songwriter, and producer (b. 1935)
1984 – Walter Alston, American baseball player and manager (b. 1911)
1985 – Ninian Sanderson, Scottish race car driver (b. 1925)
  1985   – E. B. White, American essayist and journalist (b. 1899)
1986 – Archie League, American air traffic controller (b. 1907)
1988 – Sacheverell Sitwell, English author, poet, and critic (b. 1897)
1990 – Curtis LeMay, American general (b. 1906)
1992 – Petra Kelly, German activist and politician (b. 1947)
1994 – Paul Lorenzen, German mathematician and philosopher (b. 1915)
1997 – Jerome H. Lemelson, American engineer and philanthropist (b. 1923)
2002 – Walter Annenberg, American publisher, diplomat, and United States Ambassador to the United Kingdom (b. 1908)
2004 – Richard Avedon, American photographer (b. 1923)
  2004   – Bruce Palmer, Canadian bass player (b. 1946)
  2004   – Robert Vaidlo, Estonian journalist and author (b. 1921)
2006 – Fawaz al-Rabeiee, Saudi Arabian terrorist (b. 1979)
  2006   – Jerald Tanner, American author and activist (b. 1938)
2007 – Ronnie Hazlehurst, English conductor and composer (b. 1928)
  2007   – Chris Mainwaring, Australian footballer and journalist (b. 1965)
  2007   – Al Oerter, American discus thrower (b. 1936)
2008 – John Biddle, American cinematographer (b. 1925)
2009 – Cintio Vitier, Cuban poet and author (b. 1921)
2010 – Ian Buxton, English footballer and cricketer (b. 1938)
2011 – Sven Tumba, Swedish ice hockey player and golfer (b. 1931)
2012 – Octavio Getino, Spanish-Argentinian director and screenwriter (b. 1935)
  2012   – Eric Hobsbawm, Egyptian-English historian and author (b. 1917)
  2012   – Mark R. Kravitz, American lawyer and judge (b. 1950)
  2012   – Moshe Sanbar, Hungarian-Israeli economist and banker (b. 1926)
  2012   – Shlomo Venezia, Greek-Italian Holocaust survivor and author (b. 1923)
2013 – Arnold Burns, American lawyer, politician, and 21st United States Deputy Attorney General (b. 1930)
  2013   – Tom Clancy, American author (b. 1947)
  2013   – Imero Fiorentino, American lighting designer (b. 1928)
  2013   – Israel Gutman, Polish-Israeli historian and author (b. 1923)
  2013   – Ole Danbolt Mjøs, Norwegian physician, academic, and politician (b. 1939)
  2013   – Jim Rountree, American football player and coach (b. 1936)
2014 – Lynsey de Paul, English singer-songwriter, pianist, and actress (b. 1948)
  2014   – Shlomo Lahat, Israeli general and politician (b. 1927)
  2014   – José Martínez, Cuban-American baseball player and coach (b. 1942)
  2014   – Robert Serra, Venezuelan criminologist and politician (b. 1987)
2015 – Božo Bakota, Croatian footballer (b. 1950)
  2015   – Don Edwards, American soldier, lawyer, and politician (b. 1915)
  2015   – Hadi Norouzi, Iranian footballer (b. 1985)
  2015   – Jacob Pressman, American rabbi and academic, co-founded American Jewish University (b. 1919)
2017 – Dave Strader, American sportscaster (b. 1955)
2018 – Charles Aznavour, French-Armenian singer, composer, writer, filmmaker and public figure (b. 1924)
2019 – Karel Gott, Сzeсh singer (b. 1939)
2022 – Antonio Inoki, Japanese professional wrestler and politician (b. 1943)

Holidays and observances
Armed Forces Day (South Korea)
Beginning of the United States' Fiscal Year
Children's Day (El Salvador, Guatemala, Sri Lanka)
Christian feast day:
Abai (Syriac Orthodox Church)
Bavo of Ghent
Blessed Edward James
Nicetius (Roman Catholic Church)
Remigius
Thérèse of Lisieux
Protection/Patronage of the Theotokos (Eastern Catholic Churches)
October 1 (Eastern Orthodox liturgics)
Day of Prosecutors (Azerbaijan)
Ground Forces Day (Russia) 
Independence Day, celebrates the independence of Cyprus from United Kingdom in 1960.
Independence Day, celebrates the independence of Nigeria from United Kingdom in 1960.
Independence Day, celebrates the independence of Palau from UN trust territory status in 1994.
Independence Day, celebrates the independence of Tuvalu from United Kingdom in 1978.
International Day of Coffee
International Day of Older Persons
Lincolnshire Day (United Kingdom)
National Day of the People's Republic of China (People's Republic of China)
Pancasila Sanctity Day (Indonesia)
Tampere Day (Finland)
Teacher's Day (Uzbekistan)
Unification Day (Cameroon)

References

External links

 
 
 

Days of the year
October